Richard 'Rick' Andrew Leigh Moore (born 11 May 1989) is an English former first-class cricketer.

Moore was born at Crewe and was educated at Tarporley High School, before attending South Cheshire College. From there, he went up to Leeds Metropolitan University. While at Leeds, Moore played two first-class cricket matches for Leeds/Bradford MCCU in 2012, against Surrey at The Oval, and Yorkshire at Headingley. He scored 76 runs in these matches, with a high score of 37.

He debuted in minor counties cricket for Cheshire in the 2009 MCCA Knockout Trophy against Oxfordshire. To date, Moore has appeared for Cheshire in 42 Minor Counties Championship matches, 28 MCCA Knockout Trophy matches, and 14 matches in the minor counties 20-over competition.

References

External links

1989 births
Living people
Cricketers from Cheshire
Sportspeople from Crewe
People educated at South Cheshire College
Alumni of Leeds Beckett University
English cricketers
Cheshire cricketers
Leeds/Bradford MCCU cricketers